Llanedeyrn High School was an 11–16 mixed, community comprehensive school in Llanedeyrn, Cardiff, Wales. It was established in 1970 as the first purpose-built comprehensive school in Wales and closed in 2014.

History 
Because of falling pupil numbers, in 2008 a decision was made to close Llanedeyrn and two other Cardiff comprehensive schools. From September 2011, Llanedeyrn High School did not take in any new pupils at Year 7 and the school finally closed in the summer of 2014. Remaining pupils were transferred to Llanishen High School or Cardiff High School, or could apply to attend St Teilo's Church in Wales High School. St Teilo's took over the school's old site at Roundwood Gardens, Llanedeyrn, after moving from its former location in Penylan. New state-of-the-art buildings were constructed on the former playing fields.

Notable alumni 
 Justine Picardie, author and journalist
 Ruth Picardie, author and journalist
 Colin Jackson, former athlete, sports presenter
 Suzanne Packer, actress
 Keith Towler, social worker and former Children's Commissioner for Wales

External links 
  (archive link)

References 

Defunct schools in Cardiff
Educational institutions established in 1970
1970 establishments in Wales
Educational institutions disestablished in 2014
2014 disestablishments in Wales